Clássica is the third live album by Brazilian singer Daniela Mercury, released on September 27, 2005 on Som Livre.

Track listing

References 

2005 live albums
Daniela Mercury albums
Som Livre live albums